Eremotherium (from Greek for "steppe" or "desert beast": ἔρημος "steppe or desert" and θηρίον "beast") is an extinct genus of giant ground sloth, in the family Megatheriidae, the largest and most heavily built family of sloths. Eremotherium lived in the southern parts of North America and the northern parts of South America from the Pliocene, around 5.3 million years ago, to the end of the Late Pleistocene, around 10,000 years ago. Eremotherium was widespread in tropical and subtropical lowlands and lived there in partly open and closed landscapes, while its close relative Megatherium lived in more temperate climes. Both genera reached the size of today's elephants and were among the largest mammals in the Americas. Characteristic of Eremotherium was its robust physique with comparatively long limbs and front and hind feet especially for later representatives- three fingers. However, the skull is relatively gracile, the teeth are uniform and high-crowned. Like today's sloths, Eremotherium was a pure herbivore who dined on leaves and grasses, though it may have had semi-aquatic habits like modern hippos based on isotopic data. Eremotherium was a generalist that could adapt its diet to the respective local and climatic conditions of many regions. Finds of Eremotherium are common and widespread, with fossils being found as far north as South Carolina in the United States and as far south as Rio Grande Do Sul, and many complete skeletons have been unearthed.

Only two valid species are known, Eremotherium laurillardi and E. eomigrans, the former was named by prolific Danish paleontologist Peter Lund in 1842 based on a tooth of a juvenile individual that had been collected from Pleistocene deposits in caves in Lagoa Santa, Brazil alongside fossils of thousands of other megafauna. Lund originally named it as a species of its relative Megatherium, though Austrian paleontologist Franz Spillman later created the genus name Eremotherium after noticing its distinctness from other megatheriids.

History and naming
The taxonomic history of Eremotherium largely involves it being confused with Megatherium and the naming of many additional species that are actually synonymous with E. laurillardi. For many years fossils from the genus have been known, with records from as early as 1823 when fossil collectors J. P. Scriven and Joseph C. Habersham collected several teeth, skull, and mandible fragments, including a nearly complete set of mandibles, from Quaternary age deposits in Skidaway Island, Georgia in the United States. The fossils were not described until 1852 however, when American paleontologist named Megatherium mirabile, based on the specimens (specimen numbers USNM 825-832 + 837) but the species has since been synonymized with Eremotherium laurillardi. The first published discovery was only a year after M. mirabile was discovered, when portions of 2 teeth that had been also collected from Skidaway Island were referred to Megatherium later in 1823 by Dr. Samuel L. Mitchell. 20 more fossils from the island were reported in 1824 by naturalist William Cooper, including mandibular, limb, and dental remains, that now reside at the Lyceum of Natural History in New York, that had also been collected by Joseph C. Habersham.

Several other discoveries from Georgia and South Carolina were described as Megatherium throughout the 1840s and 1850s, like in 1846 when Savannah scholar William B. Hodgson described some "Megatherium" fossils from Georgia that had been donated by Habersham, including portions of several skulls, in a collection that included fossils of several other Pleistocene megafauna like mammoths and bison. These were all described in more detail by Joseph Leidy in 1855, but they were not all referred to Eremotherium until the late 20th century. In 1842, Richard Harlan named a new species of the turtle Chelonia, Chelonia couperi, based on a supposed femur, or thigh bone, that had been found in the Brunswick Canal in Glynn County, Georgia and dated to the Pleistocene. It was not until 1977 that further analysis demonstrated that the "femur" was actually a clavicle from Eremotherium. It is unknown, which publication was published first - according to the regulations of the ICZN, the species name of the first publication would have priority, even if it was attached to another genus - but the species name E. couperi is rarely used, while E. laurillardi is more widely used and has been adopted by more scientists.

Fossils from South America were first described by Danish paleontologist and founder of Brazilian paleontology Peter Wilhelm Lund when he established a new species of Megatherium based on two teeth (specimen number ZMUC 1130 and 1131) from Lapa Vermella, a cave in the valley of the Rio de la Velhas in the Brazilian state of Minas Gerais under the name Megatherium laurillardi, the first named species now assigned to Eremotherium. Lund diagnosed the species based on the size of the teeth, which were only a quarter the size of Megatherium americanum, the greatest representative of Megatherium, and he believed that it was a tapir-sized animal. Today, the teeth are considered to be from a juvenile of E. laurillardi and adults reached or exceeded the size of M. americanum. Two years earlier, Lund had already figured teeth found at Lapa Vermella, which he assigned to Megatherium americanum due to their dimensions, which he figured alongside those of M. laurillardi in the 1842 publication. They also have been referred to Eremotherium laurillardi. For many years, E. laurillardi's holotype was speculated to actually have come from a dwarf species of Eremotherium while the larger fossils belonged to another distinct species like E. rusconii, a species that was erected by Samuel Schaub in 1935 for giant fossils from Venezuela, though it was initially thought to be a species of Megatherium. However, this view is mostly contradicted and argues that at least in the Late Pleistocene in South and North America there was only a single species, E. laurillardi, which had a strong sexual dimorphism. Discoveries of extensive material of Eremotherium at sites such as those at Nova Friburgo in Brazil and Daytona Beach in Florida further prove that the two were synonymous and lacked any major differences between populations.

Fossils of Eremotherium from Mexico were first described in 1882 by French scientist Alfred Duges, though they consisted only of a fragmentary left femur, as a new species of the South American Scelidotherium, naming it S. guanajatense. The femur had been found in Pleistocene deposits in Guanajuato, Mexico, but the fossil has since been lost and the species is a synonym of E. laurillardi. Another species that is currently considered valid was described in 1997 by Canadian zoologist Gerardo De Iuliis and French paleontologist Pierre-Antoine St-Andréc based on a single, approximately 39 cm long femur from the Pleistocene strata in Ulloma, Bolivia as Eremotherium sefvei, though it was first described in 1915 as a fossil of Megatherium. E. sefvei's geologic aging is less definite can only be placed in the general Pleistocene, but it is the smallest representative of Eremotherium and all post-Miocene megatheriids.

Two years later in 1999, De Iuliis and Brazilian paleontologist Carlos Cartelle erected another species of Eremotherium now seen as valid, E. eomigrans, based on a partial skeleton, the holotype, that had been unearthed from the latest Blancan (Latest Pliocene) layers of Newberry, Florida, USA, though many other fossils from the area were referred to it. Many of the fossils were isolated and had been recovered from sinkholes, river canals, shorelines, and hot springs, with few of the specimens being associated skeletons. So far, the latter has only been found in North America and reached a size similar to E. laurillardi, but comes from the Pliocene and Early Pleistocene and bares a pentadactyl, or five fingered, hand in contrast to the tridactyl hands of Megatherium and E. laurillardi.

The genus name Eremotherium was not erected until 1948 by Franz Spillmann, erecting a new species, E. carolinese, as the type species of the genus based on a 65 cm long skull with associated lower jaw, both fossils come from the Santa Elena Peninsula in Ecuador, and the species name was after the local village of Carolina. Although it was the type species of the genus for many years, the species has since been synonymized with E. laurillardi and has been replaced by it as the type species. The generic name Eremotherium is derived from the Greek words ἔρημος (Erēmos "Steppe", "desert") and θηρίον (Thērion "animal") after the landscape in Santa Elena Peninsula that E. carolinese was unearthed from. The following year, French taxonomist Robert Hoffstetter introduced the genus Schaubia for Samuel Schaub's Megatherium rusconii because he recognized its generic distinctness from Megatherium, though the genus name was preoccupied, so it was renamed Schaubtherium the following year. It was not until 1952 that he recognized similarities to Spillmann's Eremotherium and synonymized the two. Another dubious genus and species, Xenocnus cearensis, was dubbed in 1980 by Carlos de Paula Couto based on a partial unciform (wrist bone), though he mistook as the astragalus (tarsal bone) of a megalochynid, that had been found in Pleistocene deposits in Itapipoca, Brazil. Paula Couto even created a new subfamily, Xenocninae, for the genus, but reanalysis in 2008 proved that the fossil was instead from Eremotherium laurillardi.

Description

Size
In any case, it is one of the largest land-dwelling mammals of that time in the Americas, along with the proboscideans that migrated from Eurasia. As a ground-dwelling sloth, it had relatively shorter and stronger limbs compared to modern arboreal sloths and also had a longer tail.

Skull
The skull of Eremotherium was large and massive, but lighter in build compared to Megatherium. A complete skull measured 65 cm in length and was up to 33 cm wide at the zygomatic arches. In the area of the back teeth it reached 19 cm in height. The forehead line was clearly straight and not as wavy as in Megatherium. The nasal bone was shortened compared to the skull of Megatherium, giving it an overall truncated cone appearance. Further differences to Megatherium existed at the premaxillary bone: In Eremotherium this had an overall triangular shape and was only loosely connected to the upper jaw, whereas in Megatherium the premaxillary bone had a quadrangular shape, as well as a firm connection to the upper jaw. The occipital bone is semicircular in posterior view and sloped backwards in lateral view. The articular surfaces as the point of attachment of the cervical spine curved far outwards and were relatively larger than in tree sloths and numerous other ground sloths. The parietal bones had a far outward curved shape, which was partly caused by the large cranial cavity with a volume of 1600 cm³. The strong zygomatic arch was closed, unlike today's sloths, but like the latter it had a massive bony outgrowth pointing downwards and backwards from the anterior base of the arch. In addition, a third outgrowth protruded diagonally upwards. The downward pointing bony process was clearly steeper than in other sloths. The eye socket was shallow and small and slightly lower than in Megatherium or modern sloths.

Typical for all representatives of the Megatheriidae was the clearly downward curved course of the lower edge of the bone body, which resulted from the different length of the teeth. The thickness of the curvature of the lower margin of the mandible increased significantly in the course of individual development, but the ratio of the height of the mandibular body to the length of the tooth row remained largely the same. This differs markedly from Megatherium, in which the height of the mandible increased not only in absolute terms, but also relatively in relation to the length of the dentition. The mandibular body was also very thick, leaving little space for the tongue. At the posterior, lower end there was a strong, clearly notched angular process, the upper edge of which was approximately at the level of the masticatory plane. At the anterior edge of the lower jaw there was a strong mental foramen. The dentition was typical for sloths, but in contrast to today's representatives it consisted of completely homodont teeth, which is a characteristic feature of megatherians. Each branch of the jaw had 5 teeth in the upper jaw and 4 in the lower jaw, so in total Eremotherium had 18 teeth. They had no roots and grew throughout their entire life. The enamel was also missing. However, two transverse, sharp-edged ridges were typically formed on the chewing surface to help grind food.

Postcrania
Almost all of the poscranial skeleton is known. The vertebrae were massively shaped, both at the vertebral bodies and at the lateral transverse processes. However, the vertebral bodies were compressed in length, so that the tail appeared rather short overall and generally did not exceed the length of the lower limb sections. The humerus represented a long tube with a bulky lower joint end. Distinctive, ridge-like muscle attachments on the middle shaft were typical. The forearm bones had much shorter lengths, with the spoke measuring about 67 cm, and the ulna  in length. Massive was the femur, which had the broad build characteristic of megatherians and was narrowed in front and behind. The third trochanter, a prominent muscle attachment point on the shaft, typical of xenarthrans, was absent in Eremotherium as in all other megatherians. The shinbone and fibula were only fused together at the upper end and not also at the lower end as in Megatherium. In this case, the tibia became about 60 cm long. The forelegs ended in hands with three fingers (III to V). The two inner phalanges (I and II) were fused together with some elements of the carpus, such as the great polygonal leg, to form a unit, the metacarpal-carpal complex (MCC). Thus, Eremotherium clearly deviates from Megatherium and other closely related forms, which possessed four-fingered hands. In Eremotherium, the metacarpal of the third digit was the shortest, measuring 19 cm in length, while those of the fourth and fifth were almost the same length,  and  respectively. The phalanx (the third phalanx) of the third and fourth fingers had a long and pointedly curved shape, which suggests correspondingly long claws. The fifth finger had only two phalanges and consequently no claw was formed there. (An exception is the older form E. eomigrans, whose hands, in contrast to other megateria, were still five-fingered, with claws on digits I to IV.) The foot, as in all megatheriids, was also three-fingered (digits III to V). It resembled the hand with an extremely short metatarsal of the third finger. That of the fourth finger reached , that of the fifth  in length. Deviating from the hand, only the middle digit (III) had three phalanges with a terminal phalanx bearing a long claw. The two outer digit had only two phalanges. This structure of the foot is typical for evolved megatherians.

Palaeobiology

Locomotion 
The predominantly quadrupedal locomotion took place on inwardly turned feet, with the entire weight resting on the outer, fifth and possibly fourth phalanges (a pedolateral gait), whereby the talus was subject to massive reshaping. Likewise, the hands were turned inwards, in a position somewhat resembling the forefeet of the similarly clawed Chalicotheriidae, a now extinct group of odd-toed ungulates. It also suggests that locomotion was rather slow. It was also unable to perform digging activities, as has been demonstrated for other large ground sloths, which can also be seen in the construction of the forearm, just as the manipulation of objects was minimised due to the limited ability of the fingers to move in relation to each other. However, Eremotherium was able to stand up on its hind legs and pull branches and twigs with its hands, for example to reach the foliage of tall trees for feeding, as well as defensive strikes with its long claws were possible. The standing up was supported by the strong tail, similar to what is still the case today with armadillos and anteaters. The massive tail vertebrae in the front area of the tail suggest a strong musculature. Among other things, this concerns the coccygeus muscle, which attaches to the ischium and fixes the tail. Less well developed, on the other hand, were the epaxial muscles, which could cause the tail to straighten up.

Social behaviour
Due to some group finds of several individuals at individual sites, such as in El Bajión in Chiapas in Mexico with four animals or in Tanque Loma on the Santa Elena in Ecuador with 22 individuals, some scientists discuss whether Eremotherium possibly lived and roamed in small, herd-like groups. Especially in Tanque Loma, the individuals recorded are composed of at least 15 adults and six juveniles. They were all found in close association in a single horizon, and they are interpreted as being contemporary with each other. The possible group was thought to have gathered at a waterhole and died there relatively abruptly due to an unknown event. On the other hand, sometimes clustered occurrences of Eremotherium such as the 19 individuals from the sinkhole of Jirau in Brazil are considered to be accumulations over a long period of time. In the case of the likewise giant ground sloth Lestodon from central South America, experts also interpret mass accumulations of remains of different individuals in part as evidence of phased group formation. Living tree sloths live solitary lives.

Diet
Eremotherium possessed extremely high-crowned teeth, which, however, did not reach the dimensions of those of Megatherium. As the teeth lack enamel, this hypsodonty may not be an expression of specialisation on grass as food, unlike mammals with enamel in their teeth. The different expression of high-crownedness in the two large ground sloths is probably rather to be sought in adaptation to divergent habitats—more tropical lowlands in Eremotherium and more temperate regions in Megatherium. From an anatomical point of view, the only moderately wide snout and the large total chewing surface of the teeth advocate a diet adapted to mixed plant foods. The average surface area of all teeth available for chewing food is 11,340 mm², which roughly corresponds to the values of the closely related Megatherium, but clearly exceeds those of the Lestodon, which is also giant but has a much broader snout. The latter genus belongs to the more distantly related Mylodontidae and was probably a specialised grazer. Moreover, the total purchase area is within the range of variation of present-day elephants, some of which also prefer mixed plant diets. Support for this view comes from various isotopic analysis on the teeth of Eremotherium. Thus, the animals probably fed on grass in rather open landscapes, but on foliage in largely closed forests. Carbon isotopes and stereo microwear analysis suggest that an individual from the Late Pleistocene (34,705-33,947 cal yr BP), of Goiás, Brazil, was a mixed feeder, suggesting a high proportion of shrubs and trees, this is in contrast to the presumed diet from specimens from Northeast Brazil, which had a diet of C4 herbaceous plants. A 2020 discovery in Ecuador found 22 individuals ranging in age from juveniles to adults preserved together in anoxic marsh sediments, suggesting that Eremotherium may have been gregarious.

Relationship with humans and extinction 
The disappearance of Eremotherium coincides with the Quaternary Extinction Event, which saw the arrival of humans in the Americas and the extinction of many megafauna, large or giant animals of an area, habitat, or geological period, extinct and/or extant that were larger than or a comparable size to humans, such as mammoths, glyptodonts, and other ground sloths. One of the latest finds of Eremotherium is from Ittaituba on Rio Tapajós, a tributary of the Amazon, that dates to 11,340 BP and includes several skull and lower jaw fragments. In a similar period, the finds at Barcelona in the Brazilian state of Rio Grande do Norte come from strata dating from 11,324 to 11,807 years ago. The amount of hunting by Paleoindians enacted on Eremotherium is a subject of incomplete, partly controversial, scientific discourse, but joint finds of Eremotherium and early human inhabitants of the region are very rare. A possible indication human altercation is a tooth of Eremotherium that may had been edited by Paleoindians was unearthed from a doline on the site of the São-José farm in the Brazilian state of Sergipe. However, Caninde Paleoindian artifacts date to 8950 and 5570 BP, which has led to two hypotheses: (1) Eremotherium lived until the early Holocene and interacted with humans, as evidenced by a potential discovery in Piaui, northeastern Brazil; or; (2) Humans migrated into the Americas earlier than typically regarded, about 15,000 BP. The anthropogenic origin of the brands is also discussed.

Classification 
Eremotherium is a genus of the extinct ground sloth family Megatheriidae, which includes large to very large sloths in the group Folivora, which, together with the Megalonychidae and the Nothrotheriidae, form the superfamily Megatherioidea. The Megatherioidea also includes the  three-toed sloths of the genus Bradypus, one of the two sloth genera still alive today. Eremotherium's closest relative in Megatheriidae is the namesake of the family Megatherium, which was endemic to South America, slightly larger, and preferred more open habitats than Eremotherium. Pyramiodontherium and Anisodontherium are also part of this subfamily, but are smaller and older, dating to the Late Miocene of Argentina. All of these genera belong to the subfamily Megatheriinae, which includes the largest and most derived sloths. The direct phylogenetic ancestor of Eremotherium is unknown, but may be linked to Proeremotherium from the Codore Formation in Venezuela, which dates to the Pliocene. The genus has numerous characteristics that are akin to those of Eremotherium, but are more primitive. Little is known about the evolution of the genus Eremotherium. It may have evolved in the Early Pliocene in South America, where only a few sites from this period are known, and dispersed by crossing the Isthmus of Panama, i.e. the formation of the land bridge connecting North and South America, in the course of the Great American Biotic Interchange. The oldest fossils come from the Pliocene of the southern United States in North America, suggesting that the species instead evolved there before colonizing South America. The discovery of Proeremotherium also supports this hypothesis, indicating that these or other close ancestors of Eremotherium first migrated to North America and evolved there, then moved back southward to South America after the formation of the Isthmus of Panama, similar to the glyptodont Glyptotherium.

The following phylogenetic analysis of Megatheriinae within Megatheriidae was conducted by Brandoni et al., 2018 that was modified from Varela et al. 2019 based on lower molariform and astragalus morphology:

Fossil distribution 

Finds of Eremotherium are widespread, but are limited to the tropical and subtropical lowland regions of the Americas. Fossils have come from more than 130 sites. In South America, fossils have been unearthed from as far west as northern Peru via Ecuador, Colombia to the east in Guayana and the Amazon basin. The southernmost discovery was in the Brazilian state of Rio Grande Do Sul, while further south in the Pampas and in mountainous states, the close relative Megatherium lived. In North America, fossils are known from the southern United States in Georgia to Texas to South Carolina and on the east coast from Florida to New Jersey. The oldest finds known so far come from the US state of Florida and belong to the more uncommon species E. eomigrans, which were found in Haile in a water-filled doline (locality 7c), 6 km northeast of Newberry in Alachua County. They comprise several partial skeletons and several isolated bones and are between 2.1 and 1.8 million years old, which corresponds to the beginning of the Lower Pleistocene. Additional finds from Florida such as from the Kissimmee River, which are too unspecific in order to be able to precisely date, the maximum age is 2.5 million years and thus from the transition from the Pliocene to the Pleistocene.

References

Prehistoric sloths
Prehistoric placental genera
Pliocene xenarthrans
Pleistocene xenarthrans
Zanclean first appearances
Holocene extinctions
Pliocene mammals of North America
Pleistocene mammals of North America
Rancholabrean
Irvingtonian
Blancan
Neogene Costa Rica
Neogene United States
Pleistocene Costa Rica
Pleistocene El Salvador
Pleistocene Guatemala
Pleistocene Honduras
Pleistocene Mexico
Pleistocene Nicaragua
Pleistocene Panama
Pleistocene United States
Fossils of Costa Rica
Fossils of El Salvador
Fossils of Guatemala
Fossils of Honduras
Fossils of Mexico
Fossils of Nicaragua
Fossils of Panama
Fossils of the United States
Pliocene mammals of South America
Pleistocene mammals of South America
Lujanian
Ensenadan
Uquian
Chapadmalalan
Montehermosan
Neogene Venezuela
Pleistocene Bolivia
Pleistocene Brazil
Pleistocene Colombia
Pleistocene Ecuador
Pleistocene Venezuela
Fossils of Bolivia
Fossils of Brazil
Fossils of Colombia
Fossils of Ecuador
Fossils of Venezuela
Fossil taxa described in 1948
Taxa named by Peter Wilhelm Lund